Maximilian Kuen (born 26 May 1992) is an Austrian former professional cyclist, who rode professionally between 2011 and 2021 for the , ,  and  squads.

Major results

2009
 3rd Time trial, National Junior Road Championships
2010
 1st  Time trial, National Junior Road Championships
 1st  Junior race, National Hill Climb Championships
2013
 8th Road race, UEC European Under-23 Road Championships
2014
 2nd Road race, National Under-23 Road Championships
2015
 1st Rund um Sebnitz
 1st  Mountains classification Flèche du Sud
 2nd National Criterium Championships
 5th Overall East Bohemia Tour
2016
 10th Visegrad 4 Bicycle Race – Kerékpárverseny
2017
 5th Croatia–Slovenia
2018
 1st  Mountains classification Grand Prix Cycliste de Gemenc
2019
 6th Raiffeisen Grand Prix

References

External links

1992 births
Living people
Austrian male cyclists
People from Kufstein
Sportspeople from Tyrol (state)
21st-century Austrian people